Rolheiser is a surname. Notable people with the surname include:

Leonardo Rolheiser, Argentine footballer
Ronald Rolheiser (born 1947), American Roman Catholic priest and academic administrator